Erik Truffaz (born 3 April 1960 in Chêne-Bougeries, Switzerland) is a French jazz trumpeter, infusing elements of hip hop, rock and roll and dance music into his compositions.

Early life 
Truffaz was introduced to music by his father, a saxophone player, and played in his father's bands growing up.

Education 
Truffaz was inspired to study jazz when he heard Miles Davis' Kind Of Blue at 16 years old, and joined Switzerland's Geneva Conservatoire for university studies.

Career
In 1996, Truffaz signed with the French EMI label. Truffaz's second album on Blue Note, The Dawn, produced together with Patrick Muller, Marcello Giuliani and Mark Erbetta. Since then they have produced many Blue Note albums together such as Bending New Corners, which became a Silver Album in France. The 2007 release Arkhangelsk is a mixture of pop songs, French chanson, and jazz-groove. In 2007 he and Ed Harcourt appeared in a Take-Away Show video session shot by Vincent Moon.

Discography 
 Nina Valéria (1994)
 Out of a Dream (1997)
 The Dawn (1998)
 Bending New Corners (1999)
 The Mask (2000)
 Mantis (2001)
 ReVisité (2001)
 Magrouni (2002)
 Tales Of The Lighthouse (2002)
 The Walk of the Giant Turtle (2003)
 Saloua (2005)
 Face-à-face (2CD Live + DVD) (2006)
 Arkhangelsk (2007)
 Benares (2008)
 Mexico (2008)
 Paris (2008)
 In between (2010)
 El tiempo de la Revolución (2012)
 Being Human Being (with Murcof) (2014)
 Doni Doni (2016)
 Lune Rouge (2019)

References

External links 
 A documentary about the recording of Erik Truffaz's album Arkhangelsk featuring Nya, Christophe & Ed Harcourt.

Acid jazz trumpeters
Jazz fusion trumpeters
Post-bop trumpeters
Swiss jazz trumpeters
French jazz trumpeters
Male trumpeters
1960 births
Living people
People from Gex, Ain
Acid jazz musicians
Nu jazz musicians
21st-century trumpeters
21st-century French male musicians
French male jazz musicians